The Bargain of Judas is a biblical episode related to the life of Jesus which is recorded in all three Synoptic Gospels,  and . It relates how Judas Iscariot made a bargain with the Jewish chief priests to betray Jesus.

Biblical accounts
The Gospel of Matthew specifies that Judas received thirty pieces of silver:
 
Then one of the Twelve — the one called Judas Iscariot — went to the chief priests and asked, "What are you willing to give me if I hand him over to you?" So they counted out for him thirty silver coins. From then on Judas watched for an opportunity to hand him over. 

The Gospel of Mark and the Gospel of Luke mention no price. Luke's Gospel states that Satan entered Judas to prompt him for the bargain:
 
Now the Feast of Unleavened Bread, called the Passover, was approaching, and the chief priests and the teachers of the law were looking for some way to get rid of Jesus, for they were afraid of the people. Then Satan entered Judas, called Iscariot, one of the Twelve. And Judas went to the chief priests and the officers of the temple guard and discussed with them how he might betray Jesus. They were delighted and agreed to give him money. He consented, and watched for an opportunity to hand Jesus over to them when no crowd was present.

Analysis
The word which is translated "counted out" (estēsan) in modern translations like the Good News Translation and the New International Version appears as "they appointed unto him" in the Geneva Bible, "they covenanted with him" in the King James Version, "they weighed out" in the American Standard Version and as "they settled with him" in J. B. Phillips' 1960 translation.
Then I said to them, "If it seems right to you, give me my wages; but if not, keep them.” And they weighed out as my wages thirty shekels of silver.

In the New Testament Jesus is later betrayed in the Kiss of Judas incident. The Bargain of Judas is considered one of the seven key episodes which relate to the events of the week of the Crucifixion of Jesus.

See also

 Chronology of Jesus
 Thirty pieces of silver
 Jesus predicts his betrayal
 Kiss of Judas
 Life of Jesus in the New Testament
 Gospel of Judas

Further reading

References

Passion of Jesus
Judas Iscariot